{{Infobox person
| honorific_prefix          = Madam
| name                      = Isabel "la Negra" Luberza Oppenheimer
| image                     = Isabel_Luberza_Oppenheimer_("Isabel_la_Negra")_del_Barrio_Maragüez,_en_Ponce,_Puerto_Rico_(DSC05441C).jpg
| imagesize                 = 
| caption                   = Isabel "la Negra" Luberza Oppenheimer, ca. 1950
| birth_date                = 
| birth_place               = Ponce, Puerto Rico
| death_date                = 
| occupation                = Brothel owner
| death_place               = Barrio Maragüez, Ponce, Puerto Rico
| death_cause               = Shooting
| resting_place             = Cementerio Civil de Ponce
| resting_place_coordinates = 
| years_active              = Mid 1930s - 1960s
| employer                  = Self-employed
| height                    = 64" (5'4")
| children                  = Manuel Morales (adopted)<ref name="salinas">Se resolvio el Caso de 'Isabel la Negra'!, foro.univision.com, 25 August 2006.  (Commentary on Libres de pagar a Hacienda grupo herederos de "Isabel La Negra" by Mayra Santos Febres, El Nuevo Día. San Juan, Puerto Rico; retrieved 28 July 2012.</ref>
}}

Isabel Luberza Oppenheimer (23 July 1901 – 4 January 1974), better known as "Isabel la Negra", was a Puerto Rican brothel owner and madam in barrio Maragüez, Ponce, Puerto Rico.Ramos Rosado, María Esther. La mujer negra en la literatura puertorriqueña. San Juan, P.R.: Editorial de la Universidad de Puerto Rico, 1999.  Her name and her brothel, Elizabeth's Dancing Club, became part of Puerto Rican folklore both during her life and posthumously.

Early years and youth

Isabel Luberza Oppenheimer was born in the San Anton neighborhood of Ponce, Puerto Rico, on 23 July 1901 to Joselino Luberza and María Oppenheimer. Apart from her business as a madam, well documented in many Puerto Rican newspapers such as El Dia and El Vocero, not much is known about her early life. One widely circulated version is that Isabel left home as a young teenager to live with a wealthy man only to find out that he was married. Another version says she dated and married a much older man, a wealthy American. A well researched and documented story of her life is presented by the prominent criminal attorney and businessman José Ángel “Chiro” Cangiano. In his legal documentary "Receso del Tribunal: Vivencias Judiciales of Jose Angel Cangiano" ("Courtroom Recess: Judicial Experiences of Jose Angel Cangiano"), he debunks those stories and documents Isabel's true story: As a young girl of the poor lower class in Ponce, Isabel fell in love with the son of a wealthy upper class homeowner in the city where her mother worked as a housemaid. The elegant gentleman, a young attorney, returned her love in various ways, including purchasing her a home where he would later enjoy her cooking and would occasionally also invite his professional friends, including attorneys, judges, and prosecutors, for socializing with their wives. Their romance, however, ended abruptly when Isabel, walking downtown with her cousin Norma, recognized her wealthy boyfriend as the groom in the nuptial caravan that passed her during her boyfriend's unannounced marriage to another girl, also a member of Ponce's upper class. Emotionally affected by the experience and "in a bath of tears", Isabel told her cousin Norma that "the man that from that day hence wants to enter my house has to pay a charge." Thus developed the beginnings of Isabel as a brothel owner.

Business and career
From the late 1930s to the mid-1960s, she owned and operated her bordello in the municipality of Ponce. At that time prostitution was tolerated in Puerto Rico. Her bordello was allegedly visited by politicians, businessmen, and clerics, although this remains unconfirmed.

Dubbed by the public Isabel la Negra, she declared herself "Madame" of her brothel. Isabel had two brothels: one in Barrio San Anton and another one in Barrio Maraguez. Some sources claim that, while her brothel businesses made her quite wealthy, the Catholic Church did not accept her donations because of her past and the nature of her profession; but others state the she made many numerous well-received and significant contributions to the Catholic Church in Ponce.

Death

Isabel la Negra was shot dead on 4 January 1974, an innocent bystander of a drug-related homicide which occurred near one of her establishments. She was 72 years old. She was buried at Cementerio Civil de Ponce. The Catholic Church, which she had allegedly supported for many years, refused to accept her body into the Ponce Cathedral as part of the ceremonies for her burial. In spite of, and some say as a consequence of, this over 13,000 people attended her funeral.

Literary and media representations
Several of Puerto Rico's most important authors and filmmakers have been inspired by Isabel Luberza Oppenheimer's life and made works based on her experiences. In 1975, Rosario Ferré and Manuel Ramos Otero published two stories about Isabel la Negra in the literary journal Zona de carga y descarga. These stories were later reprinted in short-story collections by each author.Ramos Otero, Manuel. "La última plena que bailó Luberza", El cuento de la Mujer del Mar, pp. 47-68. Río Piedras: Ediciones Huracán, 1979.

In 1979, a film about her life was released, starring Míriam Colón as Isabel, with José Ferrer, Raul Julia, Miguel Ángel Suárez and Henry Darrow. The film was titled A Life of Sin, and was directed by Efraín López Neris.

In 2006, Mayra Santos-Febres published a novel based on the life of Isabel la Negra titled Nuestra Señora de la Noche. The novel was published by Espasa-Calpe in Madrid, Spain.

Legacy
There is a street in Ponce, crossed by Papo Franceschi street, and named to the memory of Isabel La Negra at Barrio San Antón, the community where Isabel la Negra was born and raised.

See also

 List of Puerto Ricans
 German immigration to Puerto Rico
 Afro–Puerto Ricans

Notes

References

Further reading
 Fay Fowlie de Flores. Ponce, Perla del Sur: Una Bibliografía Anotada. Segunda Edición. 1997. Ponce, Puerto Rico: Universidad de Puerto Rico en Ponce. p. 108. Item 555. 
 "Isabel, La Negra, la prensa, y la leyenda." Avance. 21 January 1974. pp. 14–18. 
 Fay Fowlie de Flores. Ponce, Perla del Sur: Una Bibliografía Anotada. Segunda Edición. 1997. Ponce, Puerto Rico: Universidad de Puerto Rico en Ponce. p. 121. Item 608. 
 Radames Rivera-Lugo. "Falsas memorias ponceñas." Claridad (Suplemento Ponce Es Ponce.'' 14 July 1993. p. 9. (Includes a photo.)

External links
 Se resolvió el Caso de "Isabel la Negra"! foro.univision.com 25 August 2006.  (See also, Commentary on 'Libres de pagar a Hacienda grupo herederos de "Isabel La Negra"'  Mayra Santos Febres. El Nuevo Día. San Juan, Puerto Rico. Retrieved 28 July 2012. Archived.

1901 births
1974 deaths
1974 murders in Puerto Rico
20th-century businesswomen
20th-century Puerto Rican people
20th-century Puerto Rican women
Burials at Cementerio Civil de Ponce
Businesspeople from Ponce
Female murder victims
People murdered in Puerto Rico
Puerto Rican brothel owners and madams
Puerto Rican folklore
Puerto Rican murder victims
Puerto Rican women in business